North Calgary High School is a high school with an enrollment of 1200 students in grades 10–12 in Calgary, Alberta, Canada. The school is part of the Calgary Board of Education's public school system.

History
School construction started in 2021, and is to be completed in July 2023.  School is scheduled to open in September 2023.

References

High schools in Calgary